The Men's shot put event took place on July 9, 2011, at the Kobe Universiade Memorial Stadium.

Medalists

Records

Results

Final

References

2011 Asian Athletics Championships
Shot put at the Asian Athletics Championships